Cnephasia stephensiana, the grey tortrix, is a moth of the family Tortricidae. It is found in the Palearctic realm, and has also been recorded from Canada.

The wingspan is 18–23 mm. The species is quite variable in colour and some individuals can be contrastingly patterned. The forewings are rounded and light greyish or grey-brown, with more or less clear, irregular, darker cross-bands. The hindwings are light grey-brown.
Adults are on wing from May to August.

Eggs are laid in July and August and hatch after about three weeks. The young caterpillars make a cocoon in which they overwinter. They start feeding in spring. In the beginning they mine. Later they live in folded leaves. The caterpillars pupate from April to July.

The larvae are polyphagous and have been recorded from over 120 plant species. It is sometimes considered a plague on various agricultural crops.

References

External links
Lepidoptera of Belgium
UKmoths
Cnephasia stepensiana on bladmineerders.nl
Cnephasia stephensiana on microlepidoptera.nl
Arthropods of Economic Importance – Eurasian Tortricidae – Cnephasia stephensiana (Grey tortrix)

stephensiana
Moths of Japan
Moths of Europe
Moths described in 1849